The American cooking television series Trisha's Southern Kitchen has aired on Food Network since 2012. As of June 2018, 126 episodes of the series have aired over eleven seasons.

Episodes

Season 1

Season 2

Season 3

Season 4

Season 5

Season 6

Season 7

Season 8

Season 9

Season 10

Season 11

Season 12

Notes

References

External links
 
 

Lists of American non-fiction television series episodes
Lists of food television series episodes